The 2007 Vuelta a Peru was a road cycling race held from 2 to 11 February 2007 in Peru. It was a multiple stage race over a prologue and eight stages with a total of 775.9 kilometres (482.1 miles).

Men's stage summary

Men's top 10 overall

External links
 Fedepeci.org report
 Dewielersite report

2007 in road cycling
International sports competitions hosted by Peru
2007 in Peruvian sport
Peru at cycling events